Confessions of a Pop Performer is a 1975 British sex-farce film. This second instalment continues the erotic adventures of  Timothy Lea and is based on the novels written under the name by Christopher Wood. In this case, the original novel was called Confessions from the Pop Scene, but was later re-published under the film's title.

Premise 
Sidney overhears a band in his local pub and aspires to be their manager, not so ably assisted by his brother-in-law, Timmy, both still window cleaning for a living. They rename the band Kipper and after a misfortune, Timmy joins the line-up and many sexual encounters follow as a result. Unfortunately, Timmy's natural talent is more mayhem than rock star and disaster ensues of mostly the semi-clothed kind.

Cast
Robin Askwith .... Timothy Lea 
Antony Booth .... Sidney Noggett 
Bill Maynard .... Mr Lea
Doris Hare .... Mrs Lea 
Sheila White .... Rosie Noggett 
Carol Hawkins .... Jill Brown
Peter Cleall .... Nutter Normington
Bob Todd .... Mr Barnwell
Peter Jones .... Maxy Naus
Jill Gascoine .... Mrs Barnwell
David Hamilton .... TV interviewer
Linda Regan .... Brenda Climax
Diane Langton .... Ruby Climax
Bill Pertwee .... Husband with javelin
Ian Lavender .... Rodney
Robert Dorning .... Augustus
Richard Warwick  ....  Petal
Sally Harrison .... Patsie
Andee Cromarty .... Fanny
Rita Webb .... Fanny's Mother
Helli Louise .... Eva
Rula Lenska .... Receptionist
David Prowse .... Man at Cinema

Critical Reaction
Confessions of a Pop Performer was voted joint ‘Worst British Film of 1975’ by Sight & Sound magazine, tying with The Rocky Horror Picture Show.

Soundtrack
Pop Performer was the only film in the series to spawn a soundtrack album on the Polydor label, with musical numbers produced by Ed Welch, and credited to the film's fictional groups Kipper, and The Climax Sisters (played by Diane Langton and Linda Regan in the film, although Sue Martine provides Regan's singing voice).  The album also includes music from Confessions of a Window Cleaner and in-character ‘Timmy Chat’ from Robin Askwith.

Soundtrack listing
(Original album)

Side 1
Confessions of Timmy Tea (Three's a Crowd)
Timmy Chat (Robin Askwith)
The Clapham (Kipper)
Oh Sha La La (Kipper)
Accidents will Happen (Kipper)
Timmy Chat (Robin Askwith)
I Need You (like a hole in the head!) (The Climax Sisters)
Kipper (Kipper)
Timmy Chat (Robin Askwith)
Side 2
Hell of a Fuss (Teddy Palmer and the Rumble Band)
Pop Performer Medley (Fire and Foam, See Though Jazz, The Crash, Timmy Goes Shopping, Theme for Truncheon and Helmet)
Timmy Chat (Robin Askwith)
This is your Life (Three's a Crowd)
Charlie Snowgarden (Sam Sklair)
Timmy Chat (Robin Askwith)
Confessions of Timmy Tea (reprise) (Three's a Crowd)

All lead vocals for the group "KIPPER" were sung by Maynard Williams

References

External links

1975 films
1970s sex comedy films
Films shot at EMI-Elstree Studios
1970s English-language films
Films about music and musicians
Films based on British novels
Films directed by Norman Cohen
British sex comedy films
Films with screenplays by Christopher Wood (writer)
1975 comedy films
1970s British films